Woshantha Silva (born 16 November 1994) is a Sri Lankan cricketer. He made his first-class debut for Colombo Cricket Club in the 2014–15 Premier Trophy on 26 March 2015.

References

External links
 

1994 births
Living people
Sri Lankan cricketers
Colombo Cricket Club cricketers
Cricketers from Colombo